Plakobranchoidea is a taxonomic superfamily of sea slugs, marine gastropod mollusks within the superorder Sacoglossa.

Families
Families within the superfamily Plakobranchoidea include:
 Costasiellidae K. B. Clark, 1984
 Hermaeidae H. Adams & A. Adams, 1854
 Limapontiidae Gray, 1847
 Plakobranchidae  Gray, 1840
 Platyhedylidae Salvini-Plawen, 1973: belongs to the superfamuily Platyhedyloidea 
 Synonyms
 Actaeonidae : synonym of Plakobranchidae
 Alderiidae : synonym of Limapontiidae
 Boselliidae Ev. Marcus, 1982 : synonym of Plakobranchidae Gray, 1840
Caliphyllidae Tiberi, 1881: synonym of Hermaeidae H. Adams & A. Adams, 1854
 Elysiidae: synonym of Plakobranchidae
 Ercolaniinae : synonym of  Limapontiidae
 Jenseneriidae Ortea & Moro, 2015: synonym of Caliphyllidae Tiberi, 1881 accepted as Hermaeidae H. Adams & A. Adams, 1854
 Gascoignellidae :synonym of  Platyhedylidae
 Lobiferidae : synonym of Caliphyllidae
 Oleidae : synonym of  Limapontiidae
 Phyllobranchidae : synonym of  Caliphyllidae
 Phyllobranchillidae : synonym of  Caliphyllidae
 Placobranchidae: synonym of Plakobranchidae
 Polybranchiidae : synonym of  Caliphyllidae
 Pontolimacidae : synonym of  Limapontiidae
 Stiligeridae : synonym of  Limapontiidae

References

 
Plakobranchacea
Taxa named by John Edward Gray